Aldershot railway station is located near the town centre of Aldershot in Hampshire, England. It is on the Alton Line, part of the National Rail network, with train services and station facilities provided by South Western Railway.

It has the three-letter code AHT. The station's National Location Code (NLC) is 5623.

History

The London and South Western Railway opened the station in 1870. It became part of the Southern Railway in the 1923 Grouping. The station then passed to the Southern Region of British Railways on nationalisation in 1948.

Network SouthEast operated and served the station after British Rail Sectorised itself in 1982. South West Trains has operated and served the station since the Privatisation of British Railways in 1996.

Services

Trains are usually routed to London Waterloo via  with three services in the morning peak scheduled to go the longer slower route via Ascot (included as part of the normal Aldershot to Ascot service) and two returning via this route in the evening.

The typical off-peak service (Monday to Saturday) from the station is:
 2 trains per hour to London Waterloo,
 2 trains per hour to Alton,
 2 trains per hour to Guildford,
 2 trains per hour to Ascot,
 4 trains per hour to Farnham.

Ticket machines

There are two new TicketXpress ticket vending machines which now reside outside the entrance to the booking hall, making them accessible when the station booking hall is closed.  They are available at all times, except when remotely disabled when there is no service, such as at Christmas. These new machines sell tickets to many stations in Great Britain and accept major credit and debit cards.

The QuickFare self-service ticket machine (removed October 2006) accepted coins and banknotes and issued tickets to a variety of local destinations, as well as issuing tickets for the station car park. Discounts were available for holders of most Railcards. QuickFare ticket machines were used by British Rail and the Train Companies for many years, providing easy access to tickets at unstaffed stations and at times when ticket offices were closed.

The QuickFare ticket machine at Aldershot station was inside the booking hall on platform one.  
The place where it once stood is now occupied by the "scu" (the control centre that operates the new gateline).

Rolling stock

Services are mainly run using a four, eight or twelve car Class 450 and 2 cycles can be carried per train.
Class 444 Desiro five-car units are seen from time to time.

Up to 2005, ex-British Rail slam-door EMUs were used on the Alton Line, many of which were berthed at the carriage sidings south of Farnham station. The carriage shed at Farnham was built in 1937 around the time that the line was electrified.

The most commonly operated EMUs in recent years were Class 411, Class 421 and Class 423 units. These trains were withdrawn in 2005, except for a very few that were transferred to the Lymington Branch.

Platforms

The station has three platforms. The station entrance and ticket office is by Platform 1, which is served by trains towards Woking and London Waterloo. Tracks by Platforms 2 and 3 are signalled for bi-directional operation; these are generally served by Alton-bound and Ascot-bound trains respectively.

Platforms 2 and 3 are reached by way of the original subway and a more recent covered footbridge. Lifts are incorporated into the footbridge for disabled access.

Local features

As trains approach Farnham to the south, the mileage suddenly jumps to a higher one.

About 450m north-east of the station (towards Ash and can be seen from near the end of platform 1) is Aldershot Railway Tunnel, also known as Redan Hill Tunnel. It is 76 yards long.

Gallery

References

Sources
 
 
 
 Station on navigable Ordnance Survey map
 List of Railway Tunnels

External links

Buildings and structures in Aldershot
Former London and South Western Railway stations
Railway stations in Hampshire
DfT Category C2 stations
Railway stations in Great Britain opened in 1870
Railway stations served by South Western Railway